is a Japanese politician of the Liberal Democratic Party, a member of the House of Representatives in the Diet (national legislature).  Harada represents the 2nd District of Kanagawa prefecture, which includes the cities of Kawasaki, Yokosuka, and Kamakura.

Overviews 

A native of Yamada, Fukuoka and graduate of the University of Tokyo, he jointed Nippon Steel in 1968 and the Ministry of International Trade and Industry in 1970, the year in which he also passed the bar exam. While in the ministry, he attended The Fletcher School of Law and Diplomacy at Tufts University in the United States, a graduate school of international relations. In 1990 he was elected to the House of Representatives for the first time after running unsuccessfully in 1986 as an independent. After losing his seat in 1993 he was re-elected in 1996.

Harada served as senior vice education minister until May 2004, when he was forced to resign after it was found that he had falsely claimed to have graduated from the Fletcher School, even though he had not earned enough credits to do so. He was replaced in this post by Shinya Ono.

Harada is married with three daughters and holds official ranks in judo, shogi and go.

References

External links 
 Official website in Japanese.

|-

|-

Members of the House of Representatives (Japan)
University of Tokyo alumni
The Fletcher School at Tufts University alumni
Politicians from Fukuoka Prefecture
Living people
1944 births
Liberal Democratic Party (Japan) politicians
21st-century Japanese politicians